This is a partial chronological list of cases decided by the United States Supreme Court during the Roberts Court, the tenure of Chief Justice John Roberts from September 29, 2005 to the present.

Roberts Court 2005 term 

The 2005 term began October 3, 2005, and concluded October 1, 2006. Notable cases included the following:

Roberts Court 2006 term 

The 2006 term began October 2, 2006, and concluded September 30, 2007. Notable cases included the following:

Roberts Court 2007 term 

The 2007 term began October 1, 2007, and concluded September 30, 2008. Notable cases included the following:

Roberts Court 2008 term 

The 2008 term began October 6, 2008, and concluded October 4, 2009. Notable cases included the following:

Roberts Court 2009 term 

The 2009 term began October 5, 2009, and concluded October 3, 2010. Notable cases included the following:

Roberts Court 2010 term 

The 2010 term began October 4, 2010, and concluded October 1, 2011. Notable cases included the following:

Roberts Court 2011 term 

The 2011 term began October 3, 2011, and concluded September 30, 2012. Notable cases included the following:

Roberts Court 2012 term 

The 2012 term began October 1, 2012, and concluded October 6, 2013. Notable cases included the following:

Roberts Court 2013 term 

The 2013 term began October 7, 2013, and concluded October 5, 2014. Notable cases included the following:

Roberts Court 2014 term 

The 2014 term began October 6, 2014, and concluded October 4, 2015. Notable cases included the following:

Roberts Court 2015 term 

The 2015 term began October 5, 2015, and concluded October 2, 2016. Notable cases included the following:

Roberts Court 2016 term 

The 2016 term began October 3, 2016, and concluded October 1, 2017. Notable cases included the following:

Roberts Court 2017 term 

The 2017 term began October 2, 2017, and concluded September 30, 2018. Notable cases included the following:

Roberts Court 2018 term 

The 2018 term began October 1, 2018, and concluded October 6, 2019. Notable cases included the following:

Roberts Court 2019 term 

The 2019 term began October 7, 2019, and concluded October 4, 2020. Notable cases included the following:

Roberts Court 2020 term 

The 2020 term began October 5, 2020, and concluded October 3, 2021. Notable cases included the following:

Roberts Court 2021 term 

The 2021 term began October 4, 2021, and concluded on October 2, 2022. The Supreme Court decided the following cases:

Roberts Court 2022 term 

The 2022 term began on October 3, 2022, and concludes on October 1, 2023. As of February, the Supreme Court has decided the following cases:

References
.

Further reading
Marcia Coyle, The Roberts Court: The Struggle for the Constitution (2013)

External links
 Supreme Court's website - contains recent decisions, oral argument transcripts, and argument schedule

Roberts